Gatta Kusthi is a 2022 Indian Tamil-language romantic sports comedy drama film written and directed by Chella Ayyavu. It was jointly produced by Ravi Teja, Vishnu Vishal, Shubhra and Aryan Ramesh through the companies RT Team Works and VV Studioz. The film stars Vishnu Vishal and Aishwarya Lekshmi. The film's songs and background score were composed by Justin Prabhakaran. The story is set against the backdrop of submission wrestling form gatta gusthi. 

It was shot extensively across Tamil Nadu including Tenkasi, Chennai, Pallavaram, Courtallam, Ambasamudram, Pollachi and Kerala including Alappuzha and Palakkad. The film was released in theatres on 2 December 2022. The film received positive reviews from critics.

Plot
Veera who is bought up as a male chauvinist by his uncle Ratnam, is seeking a bride with his own preconceived set of conditions. Examples include a bride who is less educated than him (he finished up to 8th Grade), have long hair, silent and obedient and does not plan to have a career as she has to devout her life to her husband. However, he unexpectedly ends up marrying Keerthi who is the polar opposite to his expectations. Keerthi is a wrestler who has anger issues, short hair and a University graduate. She refuses to marry because she wants to focus on her career as a wrestling champion, however her father had a heart attack and wants her to get married. Her uncle Ganesan arranges her marriage to him and convinces her to lie about herself and pretend to adjust to Veera's type. Hence she has to wear hair extensions and control her anger. She accepted Veera's marriage proposal only because he refuses dowry. Within a few months, she had to deal with Veera and his misogyny, however when Veera was going to get killed by Dass over a political disagreement, Keerthi shows her true colors and saves his life. This makes Veera scared of her because he is worried that she will beat him up. This also gets everyone making fun of him that his wife is much stronger and 'manlier' than him. Sattam, the family lawyer, shows Veera the real truth about Keerthi. This makes Veera fearfully respect Keerthi. With this incident, Keerthi rises to popularity. When Ratnam returns from prison, he disrespects Keerthi because he thinks she is inferior to him, which results in Keerthi slapping him. Veera comes to know about this and slaps her and kicks her out of the house. Keerthi leaves the house and vows to come back only when Veera realizes his mistake and accepts that men and women are equal.

Keerthi returns home and her father enrolls her for a wrestling competition intentionally, which she refuses to apply. To make matters worse, Ratnam and Sattam decide to file a divorce under Veera's name (which Veera does not know) through a letter. This makes Keerthi take up wrestling. When Veera realizes that she has signed up for wrestling, Veera decides to end his life as he lost respect (after Dass refuses to fight him because of Keerthi). They provoke him to fight against her to gain his masculinity. His uncle convinces the association to have a separate wrestling match between Veera and Keerthi. Lokesh, Keerthi's new coach who lusts after her, makes this happen for business purposes. Veera gets trained by Kodangi, who is a traditional wrestler. He refuses to train him initially because he wanted to be prepared for the match in 15 days, but Veera lies saying he is doing for this for his wife- which Kodangi agrees to help because he is a widower. He trains hard and understands the pain wrestlers go through.

The day before the match, he goes to meet Ratnam but instead meets his aunt (Ratnam's wife) who says that he has already lost a match against his wife and that he is not a good husband. She reveals that Keerthi likes him and also she dreams of becoming a wrestler. His aunt admits that she is also a University graduate but she unfortunately chose the life of marriage for the sake of family. she says that Keerthi and many other women sacrifice their careers for the sake of family and marriage. Veera realizes he is not a good husband. He finds that she has won a lot of medals. That night, he goes to visit Keerthi which is interrupted by Lokesh. Lokesh lies saying that Keerthi does not want to see Veera. Upset by this he leaves. On the day of the match, Lokesh tries to assault her on the pretext of comforting her. The doctor reveals that Keerthi is pregnant, after checking her blood test (required for wrestlers to see if they are fit enough to wrestle) which she does not know about. The doctor advises that Keerthi should not wrestle, which Lokesh refuses because he wants the money from the attention for the spouses fighting each other. When the match begins, Keerthi faints and is taken to the hospital. Veera who wants to see her is refused to by Lokesh and asks him to fight the other wrestlers, which he refuses to. Veera then challenges Lokesh for the fight. During the fight, Lokesh who is winning ends up telling him that Keerthi is pregnant and he was going to continue on with the wrestling between the spouse and put him for damages for being a bad husband for a miscarriage. Veera overpowers him and wins. He gives a speech saying that he was bought up wrong and Keerthi proved him wrong. He tells that men and women are equal and how many women should not sacrifice their ambitions for marriage and men. He goes to visit Keerthi and apologizes to her. He also tells her that the divorce was his uncle's idea and the couple reconciles.

A year and half time, Veera and their daughter watch Keerthi's wrestling match which she wins

Cast

Production

Development
The film was tentatively titled as VV18. On 5 April 2022, the film's official title was unveiled as Gatta Kusthi. The plot is set against the backdrop of submission wrestling form gatta gusthi, which is popular in Kerala. Directed by Chella Ayyavu, it is the first Tamil film produced by Ravi Teja under the banner of RT Team Works. This is second collaboration of Vishnu Vishal and Chella Ayyavu after 2018 film Silukkuvarupatti Singam.

Casting
Vishnu Vishal was cast in the role of a village ruffian. Aishwarya Lekshmi was cast in as the female lead.

Filming 
Principal photography of the film began on 7 April 2022, and was wrapped up on 11 August 2022.

Soundtrack

The film score and soundtrack album of the film is composed by Justin Prabhakaran. The audio rights were acquired by Saregama. The first single titled "Chal Chakka" was released on 23 November 2022. The second single titled "Mike Tyson"  was released on 26 November 2022. The third single titled "Sanda Veerachi" was released on 29 November 2022.

Release

Theatrical
The film was released theatrically on 2 December 2022 along with a Telugu dubbed version under the title Matti Kusthi. The motion poster of the film was released on 5 April 2022. The distribution rights of the film in Tamil Nadu were acquired by Udhayanidhi Stalin under the banner of Red Giant Movies. The trailer of the film was released on 19 November 2022.

Home media
The digital streaming rights of the film were acquired by Netflix while the Satellite Rights were sold to Kalaignar TV.   The film was digitally streamed on Netflix from 1 January 2023.

Reception
Gatta Kusthi and Matti Kusthi received positive reviews from critics.

M. Suganth of The Times of India gave the film 3.5 out of 5 stars and wrote "Thankfully, Chella Ayyavu doesn't valourise the hero's comeback, but uses these sequences to talk about the gender inequality in our society." A critic for India Herald wrote "The typical plot that director Chella Ayyavu chose is a major flaw in the film." Thinkal Menon of OTT Play gave the film 3.5 out of 5 stars and wrote "Gatta Kusthi succeeds as a neat family entertainer that manages to impress viewers with engaging emotions, conflicts and a couple of action scenes." Dinamalar rated the film 3.5 out of 5 stars. Khalillulah of Hindu Tamil Thisai wrote "Overall, this Gatta Kusthi contains reactionary ideas with features for mass cinema lovers." Haricharan Pudipeddi of Hindustan Times wrote "Karunas gets a solid comic character after a long time and he’s brilliant in some of the key scenes of the movie."  Kalyani Pandian of ABP Live rated 3.5 out of 5 stars and wrote "However, beyond all these, Gatta Kusthi has managed to win as a commercial comedy entertainer." Arvind V of Pinkvilla gave the film’s rating 2.5 out of 5 and wrote "Excellent wrestling matches are said to be arduous. This film is arduous, too - for the viewer." Srivatsan S of The Hindu wrote "Gatta Kusthi, in a way, is a counterpoint to what Salman Khan’s Sultan was. Just for that, it is a winning comedy." Navein Darshan of Cinema Express gave the film 2.5 out of 5 stars and wrote "Though the film tells aloud several times that women aren't slaves to men and they deserve better treatment inside and outside homes, it still gives the toxic males the longest end of the rope." Sruthi Ganapathy Raman of Film Companion wrote "But should women get to live their lives only if they break their bones playing a sport or work hard enough for their family?" Reviewing the Telugu version Matti Kusthi, a critic for 123telugu gave the film’s rating 2.75 out of 5 and wrote "On the whole, Matti Kusthi is a film that has a few enjoyable moments."

References

External links
 

2022 films
Indian sports drama films
2020s Tamil-language films
2020s sports drama films